Legends of Motorsport is a rock band formed in Hobart and based in Melbourne, Australia.

Legends of Motorsport have released three albums. The first was Dual Fuel which was a compilation of their Beef With Cheese and Legends Of Motorsport EPs. Their second was Remnants From The Big Bang (2006) released on Reverberation and featuring cover art by Peter Bagge. The third, released in November 2009, is entitled Yeah Uh Huh. New LP entitled "Survival of the Fittest" is out April 2016 on Cobra Snake Necktie records.

Legends of Motorsport have played at the Big Day Out and Meredith Music Festival and have supported Queens of the Stoneage, Mudhoney, Beasts of Bourbon and Magic Dirt.

The Legends played the Last Big Bang on 1 April 2017.

Discography

Albums/EPs
 Survival of the Fittest – (EP) (May 2016)
 Yeah Uh Huh – Low Transit Industries (November 2009)
 Remnants From the Big Bang – Reverberation (September 2006)
 Dual Fuel (August, 2005)
 Beef with Cheese (EP) – High Beam Music (2002)
 Legends of Motorsport (EP) (2001)

Singles
 "Meat and Potatoes" - Reverberation (July, 2006)
 "Mess It Up" - Reverberation (July, 2006)
 "Drivin"/"No Sense" - Mt Panorama Records (2005)
 "Free Radical Oxygen Cells" - Mt Panorama Records (1992)
 "Warm Milk With Honey"/"Don't Need Love" (Four track maxi single)

References

External links
Official Site
Myspace
review of Mess it up (EP) at The Dwarf
Triple J Next Wave Artist
Sauce (pdf) Gentlemen, Start Your Engines
fasterlouder Days of thunder with the Legends of Motorsport

Tasmanian musical groups
Musical groups established in 1997
Australian stoner rock musical groups
Australian rock music groups
Low Transit Industries artists